Paul Briggs (born 13 August 1975) is an Australian former boxer. He was a highly ranked contender in the light heavyweight division. He is most known for being knocked out in just 30 seconds into his fight against Danny Green in what bookies and betting agencies called a "one punch fixed fight"

Biography

Kickboxing era
Paul "Hurricane" Briggs' career began with kick boxing at a young age, turning professional by the age of 15. By the age of 17, Briggs was accomplished enough to challenge Thai kick boxer, Jomhod Sor Chid Lata, for the World Kickboxing Association (WKA) title. Briggs spent the next two years training in Thailand with the very man who defeated him. This training propelled Briggs to the WKA World Championship.

Briggs soon tired of international kickboxing competition. He quit competing and began working as a DJ.

Professional boxing
In November 1999, Paul Briggs began boxing. Over the course of 5 years, Briggs compiled a 23-1 (17 KO's) record, leading to a WBC No. 1 rating and a WBC Light Heavyweight World Championship fight against Tomasz Adamek, who at the time, had 28 wins and no losses.

First fight with Adamek
On 21 May 2005 in Chicago Briggs lost to Adamek in a majority decision. The fight was described by some as one of the most brutal in recent memory, as Briggs suffered a large cut above his left eye early in the fight and Adamek bled profusely from his nose for much of the fight, as well. Adamek tended to be the aggressor, though Briggs displayed an excellent defence as well as flashes of power that, at times, staggered Adamek. Both fighters won subsequent tune-up fights and were contracted to a rematch.

Rematch with Adamek 
The rematch took place on 6 October 2006. Adamek came in a heavy favourite. Briggs was coming in with a new trainer, Johnny Lewis. The rematch would be the same as the first fight, action packed and very entertaining. Briggs seemed to be getting outboxed in the first round until he unleashed a heavy left hook to Adamek's jaw which dropped the champion. Adamek managed to get up and continue and survived the round. Again Briggs was cut in the second round. It appeared to be from a punch and it also appeared to be in a bad spot: over his left eye. Johnny Lewis managed to stop the bleeding for most of the fight and the cut was not a major factor. Briggs showed more aggression this time around and made it a very close fight. A case could have been made for either fighter winning. But in the end it came down to another majority decision which Adamek won yet again. Many who watched the fight have stated although Adamek seemed to be the busier of the two, his punches were ineffective and landed mostly on the arms and gloves of Briggs.

After Adamek 
After the second loss to Adamek, Briggs decided against a third match, stating he wanted to go for new opponents:
I'm not hanging them up. I can fight and I am exciting to watch. Jim Lampley and lots of other people are telling me it was the best combined 24 rounds they have ever seen. There are some good things for me over here now (America). I am building a great fan base now, even though I am not winning.

After the fight, Don King said he supported Briggs and wanted to see him back.

Retirement
After the Adamek fight, Briggs had one more fight, winning a 12-round UD over South African Rupert van Aswegen. Briggs injured his ankle one day before the bout, and fought what he called the worst performance of his career. He was to continue fighting but when back in training, he started having serious problems. He had scans done and it was revealed he had problems with his nervous system.  Briggs was thought to have gotten past his problems, and relocated back to the Gold Coast where he began working with a new trainer. He also revealed he was moving down to the super-middleweight division and challenged fellow Australian Anthony Mundine to a fight. A couple of weeks into training however Briggs again had problems, and on the advice of his new trainer, retired from the sport. Briggs is currently located on the Gold Coast, and frequently commentates boxing matches on Fox Sports and Mainevent.

Return to the ring
On 21 July 2010, Briggs returned to the ring in Perth to take on Danny Green for the IBO cruiserweight title. Before the bout Green labelled Briggs "unprofessional" after the latter weighed in nearly 4 kg over the agreed-upon weight. The ensuing fight was seen as a "farce", with Briggs collapsing after 29 seconds following an innocuous left jab by Green, his second in the fight, which appears to have at most brushed the top of Briggs' head. Briggs was subsequently booed out of the stadium by irate fans, and had to be protected by management from projected missiles being thrown at him. In a post-bout interview Green apologised to fans who had paid to attend. Online bookmaker Centrebet labelled the bout "highly, highly dubious" following a massive betting plunge shortly before the fight. The fight had been due to be held in Sydney but was moved at the last minute after the New South Wales Combat Sports Authority refused to commission the bout claiming Briggs was "unfit" to fight.

The Western Australian Combat Sports Commission later fined Briggs $75,000 and cancelled his registration as a boxer in Western Australia. They found that he had withheld the complete picture of his medical condition. They also passed evidence to the police that the Sword Boys criminal gang had bet $100,000 on a first-round KO. Paul Briggs disputed "100 per cent" the findings of the commission.

Autobiography 
During the lead up to the first Adamek fight, Briggs co-authored, with Gregor Salmon, an autobiography Heart, Soul, Fire: The Journey of Paul Briggs (2005), detailing his rise to success as an international kick boxer, his descent into organised crime, drugs and violence, and ultimately his rise back to respectability and dominance in international boxing.

Professional boxing record

Partial Kickboxing record

|-  bgcolor="#CCFFCC"
| 1999-12-24 || Win ||align=left| Noboru Uchida || MAJKF "Tornado Warning -The Invasion of Tornado!!-」 || Japan || TKO(Second stoppage) || 4 || 0:00
|-  bgcolor="#FFBBBB"
| 1996 || Loss ||align=left| Stéphane Nikiéma || Conrad Jupiters Cup,Gold Coast || Australia || KO (Knee) || 1 || 
|-  bgcolor="#CCFFCC"
| 1993-12-05 || Win ||align=left| Taiei Kin || Revenge || Melbourne, Australia || KO (Right knee) || 1 || 2:55
|-  bgcolor="#FFBBBB"
| 1994-03-26 || Loss ||align=left| Jom Hod Sor Chid Lata || Festival Hall,Brisbane || Australia || KO (Left low kick) || 2 || 
|-
! style=background:white colspan=9 |
|-
|-
| colspan=9 | Legend:

Bibliography

References

External links 

1975 births
Living people
Australian male kickboxers
Australian male boxers
Boxers from Christchurch
Light-heavyweight boxers
Sportspeople from the Gold Coast, Queensland